De Uithof is a RandstadRail station in The Hague, Netherlands. It is the final stop of line 4.

RandstadRail services
The following services currently call at De Uithof:

Gallery

RandstadRail stations in The Hague